The 1928 Idaho Vandals football team represented the University of Idaho in the 1928 college football season. The Vandals were led by third-year head coach Charles F. Erb and were in their seventh season in the Pacific Coast Conference.  Home games were played on campus in Moscow at MacLean Field. Idaho compiled a 3–4–1 overall record and went  in conference games.

In their first year in the conference, UCLA traveled to Moscow in late October and fell,  It was UCLA's only loss in the seven-game series; the teams have not met since 1948. Idaho's only other win over a PCC team from the state of California came in 1947 at Stanford.

The week after the win over UCLA was the Battle of the Palouse with neighbor Washington State, and the visiting Cougars inflicted a  homecoming shutout before 10,000; the teams had tied the previous season in Pullman. Prior to the start of the game, the new Memorial Gymnasium was presented to the university; the venue honors state residents who gave their lives in the service of their country in World War I.

Amid speculation about his future at Idaho, Erb resigned on December 22, four weeks after the season's completion. He was succeeded by Leo Calland, a USC assistant coach and former player for the Trojans.

Schedule

 The Little Brown Stein trophy for the Montana game debuted ten years later in 1938
 One game was played on Friday (Stanford at San Francisco)

References

External links
Gem of the Mountains: 1929 University of Idaho yearbook – 1928 football season 
 Go Mighty Vandals – 1928 football season
 Scout.com: Idaho – The 1920s Series (Part IV) 
Idaho Argonaut – student newspaper – 1928 editions

Idaho
Idaho Vandals football seasons
Idaho Vandals football